Acleris conchyloides is a species of moth of the family Tortricidae. It is found in the Russian Far East (Ussuri, the Kuriles) and Japan.

The wingspan is 16–19 mm.

The larvae feed on Quercus mongolica.

References

Moths described in 1900
conchyloides
Moths of Asia